Jean Bérain may refer to:
 Jean Bérain the Elder (1638–1711), French draughtsman and designer
 Jean Bérain the Younger (1678–1726), French designer, son of the above